Rothschildia orizaba, the Orizaba silkmoth, is a moth in the family Saturniidae. The species was first described by John O. Westwood in 1854. It is found in Mexico, Central and South America.

Subspecies
Rothschildia orizaba orizaba (Mexico to Panama)
Rothschildia orizaba peruviana Rothschild, 1907 (Ecuador, Peru)
Rothschildia orizaba equatorialis Rothschild, 1907 (Ecuador)
Rothschildia orizaba cauca Rothschild, 1907 (Colombia)
Rothschildia orizaba bogotana Rothschild, 1907 (Colombia)
Rothschildia orizaba meridana Rothschild, 1907 (Venezuela)
Rothschildia orizaba triloba Rothschild, 1907 (Costa Rica)
Rothschildia orizaba uruapana (C. C. Hoffman, 1942) (Mexico)

References

Further reading
 

Moths described in 1854
Orizaba